This article is a list of School Sisters of Notre Dame school and college alumni.

The alumni are listed as follows:
 Name – occupation / significance – school

Arts and literature 
 Cristina Córdova – Puerto Rican sculptor – Academia del Perpetuo Socorro
 Frances Benjamin Johnston – American photographer and photojournalist – Notre Dame of Maryland Preparatory School '1883
 Magali García Ramis – Puerto Rican writer – Academia del Perpetuo Socorro
 Lawrence La Fountain-Stokes – Puerto Rican-American author, scholar, and performer – Academia del Perpetuo Socorro
 Carlos A. Picón – Puerto Rican-American museum curator, Metropolitan Museum of Art – Academia del Perpetuo Socorro
 Shelley Puhak – American poet – Notre Dame of Maryland University '1997
 Kit Reed – American author – Notre Dame of Maryland University '1954

Education 
 Kathleen Feeley, SSND – American School Sister of Notre Dame and President of Notre Dame of Maryland University 1971–1992 – Notre Dame of Maryland University '50
 Laura Herz – German physics professor – Erzbischöfliche Liebfrauenschule Bonn
 M. Elissa McGuire, SSND – American School Sister of Notre Dame and President of Notre Dame of Maryland University 1968–1971 – Notre Dame of Maryland University '45
 Margaret Mary O'Connell, SSND –American School Sister of Notre Dame and President of Notre Dame of Maryland University 1950–1968 – Notre Dame of Maryland University '26

Fashion and modeling 
 Carolyn Mignini – American model and actress; Miss Teenage America 1965 – Institute of Notre Dame '1965
 Lauren Parkes – American model; Miss Black Delaware USA 2007, Miss Maryland Galaxy 2008 – Institute of Notre Dame '2005
 Donna Ricco – a fashion designer; designed a dress worn by Michelle Obama – Mount Mary University

Law 
 Audrey Carrion – American lawyer; first Hispanic woman elected to the Circuit Court of Baltimore City – Notre Dame of Maryland University '1981
 Katie O'Malley – American lawyer and Maryland state judge; wife of Maryland Governor Martin O'Malley – Notre Dame Preparatory School
 Gustavo Gelpí – Puerto Rican lawyer; U.S. District Judge for the District of Puerto Rico – Academia del Perpetuo Socorro
 L. Paige Marvel – American lawyer; senior judge of the United States Tax Court – Notre Dame of Maryland University '1971
 Xavier Romeu – Puerto Rican lawyer and politician – Academia del Perpetuo Socorro
 Ana María Polo – Cuban American lawyer – Academia del Perpetuo Socorro

Media, film and television 
 Marisol Calero – Puerto Rican actress and singer – Academia del Perpetuo Socorro
 Henry Darrow – Puerto Rican-American stage and film actor – Academia del Perpetuo Socorro
 Kevin Deters – Emmy Award-winning film director – Quincy Notre Dame High School
 Jenna Dewan – American actress and dancer – Notre Dame Preparatory School
 Josie de Guzman – Puerto Rican-American stage and television actress – Academia del Perpetuo Socorro
 Catherine Mackin – American two-time Emmy Award-winning journalist; NBC News reporter – Institute of Notre Dame '1956
 Mary Anne Perry-Hoffman – Former DJ at WLIF Lite 102 in Baltimore, now a news reporter for Maryland News Network
 Cheri Preston – American radio journalist; ABC News radio anchor – Quincy Notre Dame High School
 Trina Robinson – American Emmy Award-winning journalist and meteorologist – Notre Dame of Maryland University '1984
 Johanna Rosaly – Puerto Rican actress, singer, and television host – Academia del Perpetuo Socorro
 Betsy Slade – American actress – Institute of Notre Dame
 Benicio del Toro – Puerto Rican Academy Award- and Golden Globe Award-winning actor and film producer – Academia del Perpetuo Socorro
 Andrés Viglucci – Puerto Rican-American Pulitzer Prize-winning journalist at the Miami Herald – Academia del Perpetuo Socorro

Military 
 Elizabeth P. Hoisington – U.S. Army brigadier general – Notre Dame of Maryland University '1940
 Joan Queen – first woman and African-American captain of a U.S. naval hospital – Institute of Notre Dame '1974

Medicine 
 Susan Love – American world-renowned breast cancer surgeon and best-selling author – Notre Dame of Maryland University '1970

Music 
 Roy Brown – Puerto Rican musician – Academia del Perpetuo Socorro
 Marta Cunningham – American singer and philanthropist  – Notre Dame of Maryland Preparatory School '1887
 Gabriel Ríos – Puerto Rican musician – Academia del Perpetuo Socorro

Politics and public service 
 Susan L. M. Aumann – American politician; Maryland Delegate – Notre Dame Preparatory School
 Robert C. Baldwin – American politician; Maryland Delegate – St. Mary's High School
 Michael E. Busch – American politician; Speaker of the Maryland House of Delegates – St. Mary's High School
 Thomas D'Alesandro, Jr. – American politician; former US Representative representing Maryland; Mayor of Baltimore 1947–1959 – St. Leo the Great School
 Barbara Mikulski – American politician; longest serving female US Senator; representing Maryland – Institute of Notre Dame '1954
 Mark Murphy – Secretary of Education for the State of Delaware – Notre Dame of Maryland University '2002
 Mildred Otenasek – American politician; first female member of the Democratic National Committee for Maryland; professor at the Notre Dame of Maryland University – Institute of Notre Dame '1932
 Nancy Pelosi – American politician; first female Speaker of the US House of Representatives – St. Leo the Great School; Institute of Notre Dame '1958
 Pedro Rosselló – Puerto Rican politician and 7th Governor of Puerto Rico – Academia del Perpetuo Socorro

Science and technology 
 Michael Collins – American Apollo 11 astronaut – Academia del Perpetuo Socorro

Sports 
 Annika Beck – German professional tennis player – Erzbischöfliche Liebfrauenschule Bonn '2011
 Chuck Bresnahan – American professional football coach; defensive coordinator for the Cincinnati Bengals – St. Mary's High School
 Henry Ciccarone – Hall of Fame-inducted professional lacrosse player and coach for Johns Hopkins – St. Mary's High School
 Jack Cornell – American professional football player for the Oakland Raiders – Quincy Notre Dame High School
 John Dorsey – American professional football player for the Green Bay Packers – St. Mary's High School
 Jim Finigan, Major League Baseball Player and 2-time All-Star – Quincy Notre Dame High School
 Chris Garrity – American professional lacrosse player for the Chesapeake Bayhawks – St. Mary's High School
 Caren Kemner – U.S. Olympic Volleyball Team Captain and 1992 bronze medalist – Quincy Notre Dame High School
 Rebecca Meyers – United States Paralympian swimmer – Notre Dame Preparatory School
 D. A. Weibring – American professional golfer, currently playing on the Champions Tour – Quincy Notre Dame High School

Other 
 Yeardley Love – University of Virginia lacrosse player; murdered May 3, 2010 – Notre Dame Preparatory School

References 

School Sisters of Notre Dame
School Sisters of Notre Dame